"Live in Life" is a song by Australian alternative rock group The Rubens. The song was released on 14 November 2019 as the lead single from the group's fourth studio album, 0202 (2021). The song has peaked at number 21 on the ARIA Charts.

The Ruben's Sam Margin explained the meaning of the song during its premiere on Triple J: "I see it as this guy who has messed up and lost someone in his life, and he's telling himself 'No, this is fine. Change is fine, I'm ok with this'. But then realising he's not ok and trying to rectify things but realises it's too late."

The song won Most Performed Alternative Work at the APRA Music Awards of 2021.

Music video
The music video was directed by Luca Watson and Harry Welsh and released on 9 December 2019.

Critical reception
Al Newstead from Triple J said the song "incorporates sleeker pop production and ups the beat factor for a track that follows a narrator over the course of one night during the back-and-forth of a relationship breakdown."

Track listing

Charts

Weekly charts

Year-end charts

Certifications

References

2019 singles
2019 songs
APRA Award winners
Song recordings produced by Konstantin Kersting
The Rubens songs